Inis Cathaigh or Scattery Island is an island in the Shannon Estuary, Ireland, off the coast of Kilrush, County Clare. The island is home to a lighthouse, a ruined monastery associated with Saints Senan and Canir, an Irish round tower and the remains of an artillery battery. The last residents left in 1969. Most of the island is now owned by the Office of Public Works, who run a small visitor centre and carry out repairs and maintenance on the island; it was bought by Dúchas in 1991.The Irish name Inis Cathaigh was formerly anglicised Iniscathy, which later became Iniscattery and finally Scattery.

History

Saint Senan

Saint Senan was born at Magh Lacha, Kilrush, County Clare, ca. 488. He founded the monastery of Inis Cathaigh, which became the seat of a bishopric, sometime between 535 and 540. At an early time the abbot-bishop of the monastery was deemed to have authority over what later became the dioceses of Killaloe, Limerick and Ardfert. There are the remains of an oratory and house and of seven small churches or chapels, together with a round tower and a holy well. One of Senan's students was Aidan of Lindisfarne.

The legend of "St Senanus and the Lady", as told in Thomas Moore's lyric, is founded on the fact that no woman was allowed on Inis Cathaigh. Yet St Senan founded two convents for nuns, and was visiting one of them when he died. Legend has it that when his sister St Cannera or Cainnear died, she willed it that she should be buried near Senan. Senan is said to have refused by gave in to her request because she was so stubborn.  To stay true to his own edicts, Senan waited until low tide to bury her in the intertidal zone, which was not officially part of the "island", thus fulfilling his sister's wish while not breaking his own rules. St Senan died in 560 and was buried in the abbey church of Inis Cathaigh on 8 March, on which day his feast is observed.

Viking period
The Vikings first raided Inis Cathaigh in 815, killing many of the monks. The monastery was plundered repeatedly until the Vikings came to settle there themselves in the mid-tenth century. This, in turn, led to attacks by Irish kings.

Inis Cathaigh was a part of the Norse Kingdom of Limerick, which included not only Limerick itself but also several other bases in western Ireland. Given its strategic location at the mouth of the Shannon estuary, it controlled all maritime traffic up the Shannon to Limerick. The Annals of Inishfallen record that during the 970s, Norse kings of Limerick were resident at Inis Cathaigh. Ivar of Limerick, the last Norse king of the city, along with two of his sons, was slain on Inis Cathaigh by Brian Boru in 977.

Later ecclesiastical history

After the Synod of Ráth Breasail in 1111 a canonical diocese of Inis Cathaig (the spelling then current) was established. This was absorbed by the Diocese of Killaloe in 1189, but was restored by Pope Innocent VI and continued as a separate see under Bishop Thomas (1358–68). In 1378 its possessions were divided, and the island remained a portion of the Diocese of Killaloe, being later merged into the parish of Kilrush. However, there is mention of an Englishman, John Grene, as Bishop of Inis Cathaig in 1467.

Inis Cathaigh is now listed among the titular sees of the Catholic Church.

Titular bishops of Inis Cathaigh:
Thomas Jerome Welsh (1970–1974)
William Anthony Hughes (1974–1979)
John Edward Heaps (1981–2004)
Frank Joseph Caggiano (2006–2013)

Artillery battery
Scattery artillery battery, located on the south of Inis Cathaigh, was built during the Napoleonic Wars and is preserved quite well. The Shannon Estuary was one of three invasion places the French had considered along the west of Ireland. As such, places along the estuary were considered for establishing a defence. Inis Cathaigh is one of six batteries in the estuary. It was chosen on the proposal of defected French general Charles-François du Périer Dumouriez.

The battery forms a semi-circular D shape with a dry moat. 
The battery main armament consisted of six 24-pounder long guns arranged along the length of the curved D. These were mounted on traversing mounts in purpose built gun emplacements. Each gun could traverse 90 degrees on its mount, giving the battery a total engagement angle of over 200 degrees. These could fire out over the estuary and coordinated crossfire was possible with its southern shore sister battery on Carrig Island. The block house barracks had two 5½ inch howitzer gun emplacements on the roof for close quarters defence of its vulnerable rear, but these could be deployed to any incident due to their 360 degree mounting platforms. The choice of 5½ inch made interoperability of ammunition between the primary and secondary armaments possible. Even though they by themselves would not have been powerful enough to stop an invasion they would have been able to cause a lot of damage to any enemy fleet.

Former residents
In 1842, after the salvaging the Windsor Castle, Inis Cathaigh was home to Shannon Estuary Pilots and their families. The primary families of the island were the Brennan, Melican, Scanlan, McMahon, Costelloe, Hehir, Moran, and Griffin. The river pilots were highly skilled mariners, using only native currachs (canvas boats) to reach incoming and outgoing ships.

The inhabitants of Inis Cathaigh appear to have escaped the deaths and emigration associated within Kilrush and most of Ireland during the Great Famine. The total population of the island including the soldiers, actually rose from 65 in 1841 to 99 in 1851 and to 139 in 1861.  The number of houses in this period rose from nine in 1841 to 24 in 1861. The memorial inscriptions on the gravestones do not show any deaths of islanders during the period 1845 to 1850. It is thought that a combination of fishing, additional shipping due to famine exports to England, along with piloting provided good employment for the pilots and their families.

The last residents left in 1969.

Annalistic references
See Annals of Inisfallen (AI)

 AI797.2 Ólchobar, son of Flann, abbot of Inis Cathaig, rested.
 AI863.2 Repose of Aedán, abbot of Inis Cathaig.
 AI901.1 Bissextile. Kl. Repose of Mael Brigte son of Brolach, abbot of Inis Cathaig.
 AI958.3 Repose of Cinaed Ua Con Minn, bishop of Les Mór and Inis Cathaig.
 AI974.2 The son of Aralt made a circuit of Ireland with a great company, and plundered Inis Cathaig, and brought Ímar from it into captivity.
 AI974.4 Repose of Scandlán Ua hEirc, learned bishop and abbot of Inis Cathaig.
 AI992.5 Repose of Cathal son of Ledbán, abbot of Inis Cathaig.
 AI994.2 Repose of Fínnechta Ua Ciarucáin, vice-abbot of Inis Cathaig.
 AI1024.7 Senchán, son of Flaithbertach, on his pilgrimage to Inis Cathaig.
 AI1057.5 Inis Cathaig was plundered by the foreigners of the son of Mael na mBó, and a great slaughter [was inflicted] on them.
 AI1094.13 A great mortality of the men of Ireland, so that it is impossible to enumerate all the people that died. From that pestilence died: [...] Ua Maíl Muine, abbot of Inis Cathaig
 AI1101.2 A great hosting around Ireland by Muirchertach, son of Tairdelbach, and he destroyed Ailech and Cúil Rathain at Tuag Inbir, took the hostages of the Ulaid, and proceeded along Slige Midluachra. It was then a naval force came round ... from(?) the north, and they destroyed Inis Cathaig, taking many valuables from it, and committed many other evil deeds.
 AI1130.2 Mac Raith Ua Conchobuir, son of the king of Ciarraige Luachra, was treacherously slain in the termon of Inis Cathaig.

Gallery

See also
 List of abbeys and priories in Ireland (County Clare)
 Lighthouses in Ireland

References

External links

 Scattery Island by Clare County Library at AskAboutIreland

Christian monasteries in the Republic of Ireland
Buildings and structures in County Clare
Christian monasteries established in the 6th century
Religion in County Clare
Ruins in the Republic of Ireland
6th-century churches
National Monuments in County Clare
Holy wells in Ireland
Uninhabited islands of Ireland
Ghost towns in Europe
Former populated places in Ireland
Islands of County Clare
Inis Cathaigh
Catholic titular sees in Europe
Former churches in the Republic of Ireland